111 Squadron is a Reserve squadron of the South African Air Force.  The squadron is primarily involved in VIP transport and reconnaissance flights in the Gauteng area.  The squadron is headquartered at AFB Waterkloof.

References

Squadrons of the South African Air Force
Military units and formations in Pretoria
Territorial Reserve Squadrons of the South African Air Force